"All About Soul" is a song by American musician Billy Joel, released in October 1993 as the third single from his 12th studio album, River of Dreams. The single was produced by Danny Kortchmar and Joe Nicolo and features backing vocals by Color Me Badd. The song peaked at  29 in the United States and No. 32 in the United Kingdom, becoming his final top-40 single in either country. The compilation box set My Lives contains an unfinished demo version of "All About Soul" called "Motorcycle Song".

B-side
The B-side was "You Picked a Real Bad Time", which did not appear on an album until the compilation box set My Lives was released in 2005.

Track listing
UK CD single
 "All About Soul" (radio edit) – 4:15
 "All About Soul" (remix) – 6:05
 "All About Soul" (LP version) – 6:08
 "You Picked a Real Bad Time" – 4:54

Charts

Weekly charts

Year-end charts

Pop Culture
"All About Soul" was the unofficial theme song of the New York Knicks during their run to the 1994 NBA Finals.

References

External links
 Billy Joel - All About Soul on YouTube

1992 songs
1993 singles
Billy Joel songs
Columbia Records singles
Song recordings produced by Danny Kortchmar
Songs written by Billy Joel